Pure Love is a 2013 South Korean television series starring Lee Jae-ryong, Do Ji-won, Han Soo-yeon, Jeon Mi-seon, Kwon Ki-seon and Kim Tae-hoon. It aired on KBS2 on Mondays to Fridays at 19:45 for 125 episodes beginning February 18, 2013.

Cast

Kim Sun Mi's family
 Jeon Mi-seon as Kim Sun-mi
 Han Seung-yeon as young Sun-mi
 Kwon Ki-sun as Sun-mi's mother

Jung Woo Sung's family
 Kim Tae-hoon as Jung Woo-sung
 Im Si-wan as young Woo-Sung
 Ji Woo as Jung Soon-jung

Choi Min Soo's family
 Lee Jae-ryong as Choi Min-soo
 G.O as young Min-soo
 Do Ji-won as Kang Soo-ji
 Song Ji-eun as young Soo-ji
 Lee Won-keun as Choi Joon-young

Fellow Teachers
 Seo Yi-sook as Ma Eun-hee
 Han Soo-yeon as Ha So-yun
 Lee Yoon-sang as Vice Principal
 Lee Sun-woo as Art Teacher
 Inati as PE Teacher

Soon Jung's friends
 Oh Kwang-suk as Oh Pil-dok
 Jo Woo-ri as Go Da-bi

Joon Young's friend
 Jin Woo as Jin-woo
 Kim Woo-ram as Park Chi-gi

Others
 Lee Hoon as Ha Jung-woo
 Kim Sung-kyu as young Jung-woo
 Kang Dong Hwa (강동화) as Dong-hwa
 Son Ho-young as Son Dae-ri
 Ham Sung-min as Student

Cameo appearances
 Narsha as Ha Soo-bin (ep 7)
 Onew as Choi Joon-young's cousin (ep 59)
 Brave Brothers as famous music producer
 Son Dam-bi as barista
 Kim Tae-woo as Jung Woo-chul
 Kim Sung-won as Jung Woo-chul's driver
 Kim Ye-won as PE Student Teacher (Woo-sung's crush)
 Kim Dae-sung as Astrologer
 Kim Min-jong as Kim Ji-kwang
 Yoon Hae-yoon
 Big Star as Pil-dok's friends

References

External links
 Official website 

2013 South Korean television series debuts
2013 South Korean television series endings
Korean-language television shows
Korean Broadcasting System television dramas
South Korean television sitcoms